Super Smash Bros. Ultimate is a 2018 crossover fighting game developed by Bandai Namco Studios and Sora Ltd. and published by Nintendo for the Nintendo Switch. It is the fifth installment in the Super Smash Bros. series, succeeding Super Smash Bros. for Nintendo 3DS and Wii U (2014). The game follows the series' traditional style of gameplay: controlling one of the various characters, players must use differing attacks to weaken their opponents and knock them out of an arena. It features a wide variety of game modes, including a campaign for single-player and multiplayer versus modes. Ultimate features 89 playable fighters, including all characters from previous Super Smash Bros. games alongside newcomers. The roster ranges from Nintendo mascots to characters from third-party franchises.

Planning for the game had begun by December 2015, with full development starting after the completion of 3DS/Wii U downloadable content (DLC). Series creator and director Masahiro Sakurai returned along with Bandai Namco Studios and Sora, the studios that developed 3DS/Wii U, with the return of the studios speeding up the preparation process. Sakurai's goal with Ultimate was to include every character from previous games in the series despite the various development and licensing challenges this would present. Several well-known video game musicians contributed to the soundtrack, with Hideki Sakamoto writing the main theme "Lifelight".

Nintendo first teased Ultimate in a Nintendo Direct in March 2018 and fully revealed it at E3 2018 the following June. It later received two additional Directs before it was released on December 7, 2018. The game received universal acclaim, with some critics calling it the best of the series. They praised its amount of content and fine-tuning of existing Smash gameplay elements, although its online mode received criticism. Ultimate is the best-selling fighting game of all time, having sold over 30 million copies as of December 2022, and is a popular competitive fighting game. The game received downloadable content adding new fighters, stages, and other content from its release until October 2021.

Gameplay

Super Smash Bros. Ultimate is a platform fighter for up to eight players in which characters from Nintendo games and other third-party franchises must try to knock each other out of an arena. Each player has a percentage meter, which raises when they take damage, thus increasing the knockback they take and making them easier to launch in the air and out of the arena. Standard battles use one of three victory conditions: Timed, where players aim to win the most points by defeating opponents within a time limit; Stock, where players have a set number of lives and must aim to be the last player standing; and Stamina, where players must simply reduce their opponent's health down to zero to defeat them. Players can adjust the rules to their liking and save them as presets for future matches.

Players can also enable various items to attack enemies or grant them power-ups, along with Poké Balls and Assist Trophies, which respectively summon Pokémon and other non-playable characters to assist them in battle. In Timed matches, certain Assist Trophies can be attacked and defeated to earn points. Each character also possesses a powerful Final Smash attack, which can be performed either by obtaining a Smash Ball or by filling up a special meter, both of which can be toggled on and off. The game features 104 different stages included in the base game, with additional ones coming packaged with DLC fighters. They can all be played in alternative Battlefield and Omega forms or can be toggled to remove stage hazards. A new feature called Stage Morph allows players to select two stages that the game alternates between at certain intervals during a match. Other tweaks include new icons and gauges for character-specific abilities, such as Cloud's Limit gauge.

In addition to returning modes such as Classic, Special Smash, and Home-Run Contest, new modes added to the game include Smashdown, where each character can only be played once; Squad Strike, where players battle in teams of multiple characters; and a tournament mode that allows up to 32 players to battle in playoff brackets.

Spirits 

Another set of modes revolves around a new mechanic known as spirits, which replaces the collectible trophies from previous games. Each of these spirits, based on a crossover character, can be used to power up a fighter with unique abilities, which can be used to fight against human or computer opponents and earn new spirits. Players gain spirits through pre-made challenges known as "Spirit Battles" that capture the theme of the character depicted by the spirit, embodied by one or more of the game's fighters and other specific level effects; for example, the spirit battle of Rayquaza, a flying dragon Pokémon, requires players to defeat a large version of Ridley with a similar color palette and added wind effects. A separate Spirit Board mode presents a rotating set of spirit battles for players to gain spirits from. Spirits have a growth and evolution system similar to Pokémon games, leveling the Spirits to gain more powerful effects or means of merging core abilities into a new Spirit. Nintendo offers limited-timed Spirit events in cross-promotion with other games and franchises, where a number of them are only available to collect during the event. Eventually these spirits make their way into the general rotation and can be found on the spirit board.

World of Light 
The spirit mechanic is prominent in the game's single-player adventure mode, World of Light. The mode's narrative begins with an evil entity, Galeem, destroying the Smash Bros. world, vaporizing almost all of the fighter characters and placing them under his imprisonment; only Kirby, due to his Warp Star, evades this attack. Players must explore the ruined world to rescue captured fighters and spirits by completing marked challenges. Players can use regained allies and spirits to overcome certain challenges on the map and eventually defeat Galeem. However, after Galeem is defeated, a new enemy, Dharkon, takes over and, after being defeated, wages war against Galeem, and players must destroy both of them. If just Galeem is defeated, Dharkon will engulf the world in darkness, but if just Dharkon is defeated, then Galeem will cover the universe with light. However, there is a path that allows players to defeat both of them at once. When done so, the spirits are freed from the fallen deities' control and return to the real world.

Multiplayer 
The game supports local multiplayer, local wireless with other systems, and online play via Wi-Fi or LAN connections. By defeating players online, players can earn tags which can be traded for in-game currency to buy new spirits, music, and Mii Fighter costumes. The game is compatible with Joy-Con controllers, the Nintendo Switch Pro Controller, and GameCube controllers via the use of a USB adapter. Like in the previous entry, amiibo figurines can be used to create AI-controlled Figure Players that can be trained to become stronger. Sometime after the game's release, a service for the Nintendo Switch Online mobile app, known as "Smash World", was launched, which allows players to check their game statistics in addition to sharing images and videos captured from the game to social media. Ultimate features over 900 music tracks, which can be played through the Switch's handheld mode while in standby mode. Version 3.0 of the game, released in April 2019, adds a Stage Builder allowing players to create their own custom stages, and which they can share or download through the Switch Online service. The update also includes a replay editor that allow players to edit stored replays and share online with the community or download to other devices. These will be also available within the Smash World app. An update in May 2019 provided limited support for the virtual reality VR Kit of Nintendo Labo, allowing a player to view computer-only matches in VR or playing in a 1-on-1 mode against the computer. An update in September 2019 added the Home-Run Contest mode from previous Smash games.

Playable characters

Super Smash Bros. Ultimate, as with other games in the Super Smash Bros. series, features a crossover cast of fighters from several different Nintendo franchises, as well as fighters from series by third-party developers such as Konami, Sega, Capcom, Bandai Namco Entertainment, Square Enix, PlatinumGames, Microsoft, SNK, and Disney. The base game features 74 playable fighters, consisting of all 63 previous fighters from past entries and 11 new ones: the Inklings from Splatoon; Princess Daisy from the Mario series; Ridley and Dark Samus from the Metroid series; Simon Belmont and Richter Belmont from the Castlevania series; Chrom from Fire Emblem Awakening; King K. Rool from the Donkey Kong series; Isabelle from the Animal Crossing series; Ken Masters from the Street Fighter series; and Incineroar from Pokémon Sun and Moon. When starting the game, players only have access to the eight starter characters of the original 1999 Super Smash Bros. game and must unlock the rest by completing the game's Classic mode, playing through World of Light, or fighting a certain amount of battles.

Certain characters whose movesets are directly based on other characters in the game are now classified as "Echo Fighters", possessing similar movesets and proportions to the fighters they are based on, but with their own unique animations and gameplay differences. On the character selection screen, these characters can either be listed individually or stacked with the fighters they are based on. Select characters also have alternative skins featuring different genders or sometimes other characters, such as Bowser Jr. who has a selectable appearance to be any of the other Koopalings but otherwise have identical animations and abilities. Several returning characters received updates to their appearances, such as Mario having Cappy from Super Mario Odyssey accompanying him and The Legend of Zelda: Breath of the Wild's incarnation of Link replacing the one from Twilight Princess.

Additional fighters have been added to the game via post-release downloadable content (DLC). The first of these, Piranha Plant from the Mario series, was released in January 2019 and made available for free to those who purchased and registered the game with a My Nintendo account before the end of that month. Additional fighters, each coming with a unique stage and related music, have been released both individually and as part of two Fighters Pass bundles. The first Fighters Pass consisted of five characters: Joker from Atlus' Persona 5, released in April 2019; the Hero from Square Enix's Dragon Quest series, released in July 2019; Banjo & Kazooie from Rare's Banjo-Kazooie series, released in September 2019; Terry Bogard from SNK's Fatal Fury series, released in November 2019; and Byleth from Fire Emblem: Three Houses, released in January 2020.

The second Fighters Pass, titled Fighters Pass Volume 2, consisted of six additional fighters and was the final content planned for Ultimate. The first character in this collection, Min Min from ARMS, was released in June 2020. Steve, the default player avatar from Mojang Studios' Minecraft, was released in October 2020. Sephiroth, the antagonist from Square Enix's Final Fantasy VII, was released in December 2020, with players able to unlock the character a few days early by defeating him in a limited time boss battle known as the "Sephiroth Challenge". Pyra and Mythra, a dual character from Xenoblade Chronicles 2, were released in March 2021. Kazuya Mishima from Bandai Namco's Tekken series was released in June 2021. Sora from the Disney and Square Enix series Kingdom Hearts was the final fighter to be added in October 2021.

Development
Super Smash Bros. Ultimate was developed by Bandai Namco Studios and Sora Ltd., the same studios that developed Super Smash Bros. for Nintendo 3DS and Wii U, for the Nintendo Switch, with series creator Masahiro Sakurai returning as game director. Unlike previous Super Smash Bros. games, the team was not assembled from the ground up, which sped up preparation time. The project plan for the game was in the works by December 2015, when the DLC for 3DS and Wii U was in development, and finished after it was completed. Staff gathering was done soon afterward. The development period was shorter compared to previous entries in the series. Hatena also assisted with the development of some elements. tri-Crescendo contributed to programming and design.

According to Sakurai, producing a Super Smash Bros. game for the Switch was the last request that former Nintendo president Satoru Iwata had given him before Iwata's death in 2015, leading Sakurai to feel compelled to make the game the best possible product he could to respect him. Sakurai sought to include every character from previous games, as to not disappoint fans. However, he knew this would be a complex problem for both development and licensing; it would also drastically increase the cost of development. The return of Bandai and Sora made it easier for this to happen. Sakurai also wanted to adjust character abilities as to speed up the game, although not to an extent to which it would alienate players unfamiliar with the series. Sakurai knew that Ultimate was a core game for Nintendo and that it had a dedicated player base that he did not want to disappoint, and believed that completing this goal was necessary to satisfy the fan base. Sakurai was also faced with the decision to create a completely new game system or build off of pre-existing ones; he chose to build off pre-existing ones because there would only be about a third of the characters he desired in the final game. All the returning characters' abilities had to be re-balanced so they could work in Ultimate. Originally, gameplay would differ between the Switch's docked and handheld modes, but Sakurai scrapped this because the system's screen in handheld mode was better than he thought. Sakurai believed this would be the only Smash game to have the full roster of returning characters, calling the effort to include the characters, music, stage settings, and other elements as "unprecedented", and cautioned that future series games would likely be smaller in scope. However, Sakurai wants to add as many fighters as possible within Ultimate through DLC.

Voice lines recorded by David Hayter for Snake were re-used for Ultimate, despite Hayter having been replaced in Metal Gear Solid V: The Phantom Pain. Xander Mobus, who provided the voice of Crazy Hand, Master Hand, and the announcer in Super Smash Bros. for Nintendo 3DS and Wii U also made a return with new voice clips, in addition to reprising his voice role as the downloadable content (DLC) character Joker from Persona 5.  The addition of Ridley from Metroid as a playable character has been something that the Super Smash Bros. community had been requesting from the series for some time. In 2008, Sakurai had said that he knew Ridley was a high-demand character but thought that he was "impossible" to add unless they were able to sacrifice the character's size for balancing purposes. So Ridley could be included in the game, Sakurai studied the art of the character and redesigned him so he could stand upright. All characters were chosen at the beginning of development except Incineroar, who had not been created yet; the team instead left a space open for a Sun and Moon Pokémon. The Inklings' ink mechanic proved challenging to implement due to the way it interacts with environments.

The team built Ultimate from scratch with new assets and content. Localization manager Nate Bihldorff stated that the game significantly upgraded lighting effects and texture rendering from the game engine of the Wii U version. The new World of Light mode was inspired by Brawl (2008) Subspace Emissary, and Sakurai chose to start it with a cataclysmic event because he thought it would leave a greater impact on players. The team conceived the Spirits mechanic because they wanted to create an enjoyable single-player mode but did not have enough resources to create character models. While it did not let them tell stories for individual fighters or create new locations and rules, the Spirits let them use a variety of characters and assets. One part of the team chose Spirits to include in the game and had to thoroughly research them. According to Sakurai, the Spirits mode was essential for using various franchises.

Music 
Like previous games in the series, Ultimate features several well-known video game music composers and arrangers providing a mix of original music and rearrangements of various tracks for the represented franchises, with over 1,000 tracks in total. New to Ultimate is the tying of tracks to franchises instead of individual stages, as well as the ability to create custom playlists to listen to outside of the game when the Switch is in handheld mode. Sakurai stated that he began contacting composers over a year before release, providing them with a database of over a thousand suggested track ideas. In addition, he allowed them to submit their own personal favorites, with those choices being given priority for inclusion. While Sakurai oversaw the process and preferred that the music retain the spirit of the original games, the direction of them was generally handled by the composers themselves. The main theme, "Lifelight", composed by Hideki Sakamoto, is the basis of most of the game's original music.

Downloadable content 
As with previous entries, Nintendo planned to offer new fighters through DLC; however, unlike with the previous 3DS and Wii U versions where players could request which characters they wished to see in the game, Nintendo chose which characters they would add by November 2018. Like the previous title, additional Mii costumes were released as paid DLC. Certain costumes also added new music tracks to the game. Sakurai believed that despite characters like Joker, the first announced DLC fighter, not necessarily being from games usually associated with Nintendo, they were added due to being "emblematic" of the types of characters they wanted to add to Ultimate, adding that they "bring just a whole different level of fun and enjoyment for players". The Piranha Plant was chosen as a DLC character because Sakurai wanted to add diversity to the roster. Nintendo met with Rare studio head Craig Duncan at E3 2018 to discuss the possibility of including Banjo and Kazooie as downloadable content; Duncan, believing it to be "a great opportunity", agreed and connected the two development teams for further discussions. Sakurai noted that Banjo and Kazooie were the second most requested character for Super Smash Bros. for Nintendo 3DS and Wii U in a Nintendo-sanctioned fan vote in 2015, and that the addition of Banjo and Kazooie happened "quite easily", despite the property being owned by Microsoft through its acquisition of Rare, with Phil Spencer, the head of Xbox, stating that negotiating their inclusion was "an easy deal to make" thanks to Microsoft's strong partnership with Nintendo.

The development of Fighters Pass Volume 2 was heavily affected by the COVID-19 pandemic in 2020. Due to stay-at-home orders in Japan, Sakurai and his development team had to work remotely. According to Daniel Kaplan of Mojang Studios, early discussions between Nintendo and Microsoft including Minecraft content in the Super Smash Bros. series had begun roughly five years prior to Steve's addition into the game. The character's inclusion required the development team to rework every stage in the game in order to accommodate Steve's gameplay mechanics. Sakurai had wanted to include Sora from Kingdom Hearts in the game because Sora was the top fighter requested for Nintendo 3DS and Wii U in the 2015 fan vote, but initially thought the legality around the intellectual property with Disney would be insurmountable, and thus they had originally planned for only five fighters in the second pass. However, Sakurai met a Disney representative at an award venue, which facilitated the start of negotiations for Sora's inclusion. Nintendo, Disney, and Square Enix saw towards including Sora in the game and overseeing all aspects related to his inclusion, with several limitations and guidelines they were required to follow. The Sora Challenger Pack featured a promotional tie-in with the 2020 rhythm game Kingdom Hearts: Melody of Memory: players with Melody of Memory save data on their Nintendo Switch would unlock the music track "Dearly Beloved -Swing Version-" for use in Ultimate.

Release

Ultimate was teased during a Nintendo Direct presentation on March 8, 2018, under the working title Super Smash Bros., with the release year shown to be 2018. Nintendo formally announced the game at E3 2018, revealing that the full roster of characters from past games would be included, as well as its release date. Demo versions were playable at E3 in June and at the San Diego Comic-Con the following month. IGN nominated Ultimate for its Best Game of E3 2018 award; the game won Best Nintendo Switch Game from both IGN and Gamescom. Two Nintendo Direct presentations in 2018, one on August 8 and another one on November 1, were devoted to the game, revealing new characters, stages, and game modes.

Nintendo released Super Smash Bros. Ultimate worldwide on December 7, 2018. In addition to the standard retail version, a special edition containing a Super Smash Bros.-themed Nintendo Switch Pro Controller and a Switch with a download code was also released. An additional special edition contained a pair of Super Smash Bros.-themed Joy-Con as well as a Switch console, a Super Smash Bros.-themed dock, and a download code for the game. A GameCube controller with the Super Smash Bros. Ultimate logo was released on November 2, 2018.

One of the game's new additions had the character Mr. Game & Watch assuming the appearance of a feather- and loincloth-wearing Native American when using one of his attacks—a reference to Fire Attack (1982), in which players controlled a cowboy defending his fort from attacking natives. Some series fans saw this as racist, leading to Nintendo apologizing and removing the animation in an update shortly after release. Two weeks before its release, a leaked copy of the game was distributed across the internet. Nintendo took steps to issue copyright strikes on YouTube videos using data mined content, while fans worked to isolate spoilers, particularly the World of Light story mode, from those that had played the leaked version.

Reception

Ultimate received "universal acclaim" from critics, according to the review aggregator platform Metacritic. The French video game website Jeuxvideo.com called it the best game in the series, praising the improved gameplay, larger cast of characters, stages, options, soundtrack, which "brilliantly mix gargantuan content with nostalgia". Tom Marks of IGN agreed and called it the most complete Super Smash Bros. yet. Critics lauded the huge cast of characters and levels, new game modes, and combining of the best elements from its predecessors. However, the game's online mode received criticism for its technical performance and matchmaking. Many players found significant lag affecting their games, even when using wired connections over wireless, while the game's matchmaking features did not adhere to players' criteria, with players frequently playing matches with rule sets they did not choose. The matchmaking process was further criticized for making it difficult for friends to join matches over random players, and not allowing multiple local players to join in online matches. There had been so many complaints on Ultimate subreddit that the administrators forwarded all complaints to a separate thread.

Sales
In November 2018, Nintendo announced Ultimate was the most pre-ordered game for the Switch and in the series. The Association for UK Interactive Entertainment reported that Ultimate was the fastest-selling Switch and Super Smash Bros. game in the United Kingdom, with physical launch sales 302% higher than those for Super Smash Bros. for Wii U, 233% higher than those for 3DS, and 62.5% higher than those for Brawl. In its first three days on sale in Japan, the game sold 1.2 million copies, outselling Pokémon: Let's Go, Pikachu! and Let's Go, Eevee! and The Legend of Zelda: Breath of the Wild in the region.

Within 11 days of its release, Ultimate had sold more than three million copies within the United States, making it the fastest-selling Switch game in the country. It was similarly the fastest-selling Switch game as well as the fastest-selling game for any Nintendo console in Europe based on the first 11-day sales. It was estimated that the game sold and shipped over five million copies within its first three days of release. Within three weeks, Ultimate became the fifth best-selling Switch game in the United Kingdom, surpassing the sales of Splatoon 2. In January 2019, Amazon reported that Ultimate was their highest selling video game product of 2018, with Nintendo officially announcing that the game had shipped over 12.08 million copies worldwide. Ultimate was also Nintendo's fastest-selling game of all time until being surpassed by Pokémon Sword and Shield in 2019. By September 2020, the game had sold over 21.10 million copies worldwide, making it the best-selling fighting game of all time, surpassing the record of Street Fighter II, and became the third-best-selling Nintendo Switch game, only behind Animal Crossing: New Horizons and Mario Kart 8 Deluxe. , total sales reached 30.04 million.

Awards
The game won the award for "Best Nintendo Switch Game", "Best Fighting Game", and "Best Multiplayer Game" in IGN's Best of 2018 Awards, whereas its other nominations were for "Game of the Year" and "Best Video Game Music".

Esports 

EVO 2019, held on August 2–4, 2019, featured Ultimate as one of its main events. It was the largest offline Smash Bros. tournament of all time, with 3,534 entrants signed up. It set a new record for EVO concurrent viewership, with over 279,000 viewers during Top 8. On May 8–10, 2020, top Super Smash Bros. Melee player Hungrybox partnered with NFL running back Le'Veon Bell and esports organization Team Liquid to host The Box, an online tournament with a $10,000 prize pool. With over 8,000 entrants, it was the largest online Smash Bros. tournament of all time.

In February 2020, it was announced that the Smash World Tour would feature both Super Smash Bros. Melee and Smash Bros. Ultimate players for a grand prize pool of $250,000. The tournament would have included international qualifiers, with the grand finals' location to be in the United States. However, the COVID-19 pandemic quickly led to several of the qualifiers getting either postponed or canceled. The Smash World Tour was successfully relaunched in 2021, featuring a mix of online and offline qualifiers and culminating in a final offline championship. In 2022, an officially licensed circuit was introduced, being the Panda Cup, featuring Super Smash Bros. Melee and Super Smash Bros. Ultimate. However, on Thanksgiving Day 2022, Nintendo stated that the Smash World Tour 2022 could not continue, as they did not have a license from Nintendo. Accusations of Panda CEO, Alan Bunney, caused many players who had qualified for the Panda Cup to drop out. This caused both the Panda Cup and the Smash World Tour 2022 Championships to be cancelled, along with the Smash World Tour 2023.

Notes

References

External links 
 
 
 

2018 video games
2.5D fighting games
Bandai Namco games
Crossover fighting games
D.I.C.E. Award for Fighting Game of the Year winners
Esports games
Fighting games
Fighting games used at the Evolution Championship Series tournament
Golden Joystick Award winners
Interactive Achievement Award winners
Japan Game Awards' Game of the Year winners
Multiplayer and single-player video games
Nintendo Switch games
Nintendo Switch-only games
Platform fighters
Super Smash Bros.
The Game Awards winners
Video games developed in Japan
Video games directed by Masahiro Sakurai
Video games scored by Hideki Sakamoto
Video games that use Amiibo figurines
Video games with AI-versus-AI modes
Video games with alternate endings
Video games with downloadable content
Video games with user-generated gameplay content